"Magic Hour" is Japanese voice actress and singer Maaya Uchida's 2nd album, released on April 25, 2018.

Track listings

Charts

References

2018 albums
J-pop albums
Japanese-language albums
Pony Canyon albums